Portugis, or Ternateño, was a Portuguese-based creole language spoken by Christians of mixed Portuguese and Malay ancestry in the islands of Ambon and Ternate in the Moluccas (Indonesia), from the 16th to the middle of the 20th century.

Portugis was a creole based chiefly on Portuguese and Malay.

The language was gradually replaced by a variant of Malay called Ambonese Malay.

See also 
 Chavacano (a Spanish-based creole language spoken in the Philippines, including people of Ternate descent)
 Kristang language

References 

Portuguese-based pidgins and creoles
Languages attested from the 16th century
Languages extinct in the 20th century
Languages of Indonesia
Portuguese language in Asia